James William "Jimmy" Dixon (born February 11, 1945)  is a  Republican member of the North Carolina House of Representatives.  A farmer from Warsaw, North Carolina, Dixon has represented the 4th district (including constituents in Duplin and Wayne counties) since 2011.

Early life and education
Dixon was born in Friendship, North Carolina. He graduated from James Kenan High School in Warsaw where he excelled in football. He attended Wake Forest University on a football scholarship and graduated in 1969 with a B.S. degree.

Electoral history
Dixon did not hold any political office before winning election to the State House in 2010.

2020

2018

2016

2014

2012
Dixon and fellow incumbent Republican Efton Sager were both drawn into the same district after district lines were changed following census redistricting. Dixon defeated Sager, 62.30%–37.70%, in the Republican primary. Dixon went on to win re-election with 65% of the vote over Democratic challenger Rebecca H. Judge and Constitution Party nominee, who ran officially as a Libertarian, Kevin "Kenny" E. Hayes

2010
Democratic incumbent Russell Tucker announced that he was retiring and would not seek re-election. Jimmy Dixon decided to run and was unopposed in the Republican primary. In the general election, he went on to face Democratic physician Mott Blair, who also was unopposed in his party primary.

Together, they spent over $250,000. Dixon defeated Blair by just 477 votes out of the 17,531 cast.

2008
In 2008 Dixon ran unsuccessfully as a Democrat for a seat on the Duplin County Board of Commissioners.  He was defeated in a Democratic runoff by Frances Parks.

Committee assignments

2021-2022 session
Appropriations (Vice Chair)
Appropriations - Agriculture and Natural and Economic Resources (Senior Chair)
Agriculture (Senior Chair)
Energy and Public Utilities 
Environment
Health
Redistricting 
Rules, Calendar, and Operations of the House

2019-2020 session
Appropriations (Vice Chair)
Appropriations - Agriculture and Natural and Economic Resources (Senior Chair)
Agriculture (Senior Chair)
Energy and Public Utilities
Environment 
Rules, Calendar, and Operations of the House

2017-2018 session
Appropriations (Vice Chair)
Appropriations - Agriculture and Natural and Economic Resources (Chair)
Agriculture (Chair)
Environment
Education - K-12
Elections and Ethics Law
Regulatory Reform

2015-2016 session
Appropriations (Vice Chair)
Appropriations - Agriculture and Natural and Economic Resources (Chair)
Agriculture (Chair)
Environment
Education - K-12
Elections
Regulatory Reform
Insurance

2013-2014 session
Appropriations
Agriculture (Chair)
Environment
Education
Elections
Regulatory Reform

2011-2012 session
Appropriations
Agriculture (Vice Chair)
Environment
Education
Elections
Judiciary

References

External links

NC General Assembly House profile.
 

Living people
1945 births
People from Wake County, North Carolina
People from Warsaw, North Carolina
Wake Forest University alumni
Republican Party members of the North Carolina House of Representatives
21st-century American politicians